Furuseth is a surname. Notable people with the surname include:
Andrew Furuseth (born 1854), American labor leader
Henrik Furuseth (born 1996), Norwegian racing driver
Ole Kristian Furuseth (born 1967), Norwegian alpine skier
Petter Furuseth (born 1978), Norwegian soccer player
Per Otto Furuseth (born 1947), Norwegian team handball player and coach
Rolf Furuseth (1915-1984), Norwegian politician